Taoura, known in antiquity as Thagora, is a town and commune in Souk Ahras Province in north-eastern Algeria.

History

Thagora was a Carthaginian and Roman town in the African interior. It minted its own bronze coins.

References

Communes of Souk Ahras Province
Cities in Algeria
Algeria